Keenen Tomlinson (born 22 May 1997) is a Jamaica international rugby league footballer who plays as a  forward for the Keighley Cougars in Betfred League 1.

Background
Tomlinson was born in Leeds, West Yorkshire, England, and is the son of former Keighley Cougars winger, Max Tomlinson. He is of Jamaican descent.

He played rugby union with Moortown as a child before starting to play rugby league for Stanningley.

Playing career

Club career
Tomlinson came through the youth system at the Bradford Bulls, making his debut in the 2017 season.

He spent time on loan from Bradford at the London Skolars in League 1.

Tomlinson left the Bulls at the end of 2017 to join the Batley Bulldogs ahead of the 2018 RFL Championship.

He joined the Dewsbury Rams ahead of the 2021 RFL Championship.

International career
Tomlinson made his international debut for Jamaica against Ireland in 2016.

In 2022 he was named in the Jamaica squad for the 2021 Rugby League World Cup.

References

External links
Bulls profile
Jamaica profile

1997 births
Living people
Bradford Bulls players
Dewsbury Rams players
English rugby league players
English people of Jamaican descent
Jamaica national rugby league team players
Keighley Cougars players
London Skolars players
Rugby league players from Leeds
Rugby league second-rows